Figure and ground or Figure ground may refer to:
 Figure and ground (media), a concept developed by media theorist Marshall McLuhan
 Figure–ground (perception), referring to humans' ability to separate foreground from background in visual images. Figure-ground perception is one of the main issues in gestalt psychology.
 Figure-ground in map design, the ability to easily discriminate the main figure from the ground
 Figure/Ground, open-source para-academic website

See also 
 Background (disambiguation)
 Foreground and background (disambiguation)